Alexander Matheson may refer to:

Sir Alexander Matheson, 1st Baronet (1805–1886), Scottish businessman and Liberal politician
Sir Alexander Matheson, 3rd Baronet (1861–1929), member of the Senate of Australia
Alexander Matheson (pharmacist), British businessman and Lord Lieutenant of the Western Isles
Alexander E. Matheson (1868–1931), American legislator and jurist
Alexander Wallace Matheson (1903–1976), Prince Edward Island politician